Don Gregorio Soriano Araneta (born  Gregorio Araneta y Soriano; April 16, 1869 – May 9, 1930) was a Filipino lawyer, businessman, and nationalist, during the Spanish and American colonial periods.

Early life and career
In 1891, he graduated from the University of Santo Tomas with a degree in law. He defended prominent Filipinos accused of financially supporting the Katipunan.

In May 1898, Araneta was appointed member of the 21-man Consultative Assembly, which the Spanish Governor-General of the Philippines Basilio Agustin formed in an attempt to rally Filipinos to the Spanish side of the Spanish–American War. This assembly, however, failed.

Aguinaldo's Cabinet
Araneta participated in the drafting of the Malolos Constitution. He resigned as Secretary and accepted his appointment as Justice of the Ministry of Justice.

Supreme Court
On January 25, 1899, the Diplomatic Corps of the First Philippine Republic was organized and Araneta was among those appointed as member but he chose to abandon the revolutionary government. Months after the Philippine–American War broke out, America established the civil courts in the Philippines. In May 1899, General Elwell Otis appointed Araneta as Associate Justice of the Philippine Supreme Court, the youngest to occupy the position at 30 years old. Araneta's sympathies became clearer when he joined the Federal Party that favored America's annexation of the Philippines.

Bureau of Justice
On June 15, 1901, he was appointed Solicitor General. When Attorney General Lebbeus R. Wilfley accepted a post in China, Araneta was made his successor. He took his oath of office as Attorney General on July 16, 1906. Two years after, July 1, 1908, he was appointed to the Philippine Commission and at the same time Secretary of Justice and Finance. He was the first Filipino to hold a sensitive post, being a commissioner with portfolio. He resigned from government service on October 10, 1913. With Salvador Zaragoza, he established a law office, which attracted many clients.

Later career
During the first Senatorial election in 1916, he ran for a seat in the Senate but lost to Rafael Palma. That same year, he accepted a teaching post in the University of Santo Tomas and at the same attended to his private law practice. Araneta convinced the Supreme Court to reverse its previous decision on two cases. Araneta also gained respect for his ethical principles. He turned down the offer of House Speaker Sergio Osmeña to seat as Chief Justice of the Supreme Court in favor of Manuel Araullo, who he thought to be more deserving for the post. He was again offered the same position during the time of Senate President Manuel L. Quezon but he also declined, this time for delicadeza, because he was then involved in a case pending before the Supreme Court.

Personal life
Araneta married Carmen Zaragoza y Rojas on March 7, 1896. The couple had 14 children: Carmen, Jose, Salvador, Consuelo, Paz, Rosa, Antonio, Teresa, Ramon, Vicente, Conchita, Margarita, Luis and Francisco.

Death
He died on May 9, 1930 of myocardial infarction. His remains were interred at the La Loma Cemetery on the next day.

References

1869 births
1930 deaths
19th-century Filipino lawyers
20th-century Filipino businesspeople
20th-century Filipino lawyers
Aguinaldo administration cabinet members
Araneta family
Filipino activists
People from Iloilo City
People from Quiapo, Manila
Members of the Philippine Commission
Secretaries of Finance of the Philippines
Secretaries of Justice of the Philippines
Solicitors General of the Philippines
University of Santo Tomas alumni